A parts kit is a collection of weapon (notably firearm) parts that, according to the Bureau of Alcohol, Tobacco, Firearms, and Explosives (ATF), "is designed to or may be readily be assembled, completed, converted, or restored to expel a projectile by the action of an explosive." As an example, the kit may not include a receiver or include an incomplete receiver. In most cases under U.S. law, the receiver must be serialized, and it requires a background check to purchase, among other considerations. This is different from other countries where pressure bearing parts such as bolts, barrels, and gas pistons are the regulated parts. A receiver can be purchased or manufactured to complete the firearm.

The National Firearms Act (NFA) restricts the possession of automatic firearms, so most parts kits end up used with a semi-automatic receiver. In addition, under US gun law, a receiver that is legally a machine gun cannot legally become semi-automatic. There is no federal restriction on the purchase and import of machine gun parts kits (minus the barrel), however.

Parts kits are available for many firearms including the AR-15 and AKM variants.

References

Firearm components